Edgar Espinoza (born May 27, 1989) is an American professional soccer player who plays as a defender.

Career

Early career
Espinoza started his collegiate career with Compton College before transferring to Kansas Wesleyan University where he played for the Kansas Wesleyan Coyotes. He then signed for the Los Angeles Misioneros of the USL Premier Development League.

Atlanta Silverbacks
On March 6, 2014 it was announced that Espinoza had signed with the Atlanta Silverbacks of the North American Soccer League. He made his professional debut for the side on April 13, 2014 against the New York Cosmos. He started and played 74 minutes as the Silverbacks lost 4–0. On February 13, 2015 it was announce that Edgar had left the Silverbacks.

Tulsa Roughnecks
Espinoza signed for Tulsa Roughnecks on 28 July 2016, having previously been with FC Shirak in Armenia.

Career statistics

References

External links 
 Atlanta Silverbacks Profile.

1989 births
Living people
LA Laguna FC players
Atlanta Silverbacks players
Cal FC players
FC Tulsa players
Association football defenders
USL League Two players
North American Soccer League players
USL Championship players
Kansas Wesleyan University alumni
American expatriate soccer players
Expatriate footballers in Armenia
FC Golden State Force players
Soccer players from Los Angeles
Kansas Wesleyan Coyotes men's soccer players
American soccer players